Yengi Kandi may refer to:
 Yengi Kandi, Hashtrud, East Azerbaijan Province
 Yengi Kandi, Meyaneh, East Azerbaijan Province
 Yengi Kandi, Kaghazkonan, Meyaneh County, East Azerbaijan Province
 Yengi Kandi, Tabriz, East Azerbaijan Province
 Yengi Kandi, Kurdistan